Jaak Valge (born 1 March 1955 in Kiviõli) is an Estonian historian and politician. He has been member of XIV Riigikogu.

In 1987 he graduated from the University of Tartu. 1995-2004 he was a lecturer in Tartu University.

He has published over 60 scientific articles and books.

1989-1993 he was a member of Estonian National Independence Party. Since 2018 he is a member of Estonian Conservative People's Party.

References

1955 births
20th-century Estonian historians
21st-century Estonian historians
Academic staff of the University of Tartu
Conservative People's Party of Estonia politicians
Living people
Members of the Riigikogu, 2019–2023
Members of the Riigikogu, 2023–2027
People from Kiviõli
University of Tartu alumni